Stockdale Mill, also known as the Roann Roller Mill, is a historic grist mill building located in Paw Paw Township, Wabash County, Indiana.  It was built between 1855 and 1857, and is a -story, post and beam frame mill building. The mill is powered by a 202 foot long dam that spans the Eel River. Also on the property are the contributing storage building and corn crib.  The mill remained in operation until 1964 and was restored in 2002.

It was listed on the National Register of Historic Places in 2004.

References

External links
Stockdale Mill

Grinding mills in Indiana
Grinding mills on the National Register of Historic Places in Indiana
Industrial buildings completed in 1857
Buildings and structures in Wabash County, Indiana
National Register of Historic Places in Wabash County, Indiana
1857 establishments in Indiana
Museums in Wabash County, Indiana
Mill museums in Indiana